Foolad Mobarakeh Sepahan Sport Club (Bâšgâh-è Varzeši-ye Fulâd-è Mobârake-ye Sepâhân), commonly known as Sepahan S.C., are an Iranian sports club based in Isfahan, best known for their association football branch that play in the Persian Gulf Pro League, the highest tier of Iranian football.

In the 2002–03 season, Sepahan ended the total dominance of two Tehran-based clubs, Persepolis and Esteghlal, to win the Pro League. They are also the first Iranian club to win three consecutive league titles, reach the AFC Champions League final in 2007 and qualify for the 2007 FIFA Club World Cup, becoming the first-ever Iranian representative of the tournament. To date, they have won five league titles and four Hazfi Cups, becoming one of the most successful football clubs in Iran.

Esteghlal is Sepahan's biggest and most important rival

Sepahan are owned by the Mobarakeh Steel Company.

Club history

Before the revolution

In 1953, with the help of Iran national football team player Mahmoud Hariri the Shahin Isfahan football club was created. This club was one of the teams attached to the more popular and successful Shahin F.C. of Tehran. In 1963, Shahin as the representative of Isfahan Province became champions of Iran after a 1–1 draw against Tehran XI. In 1967, due to the problems that arose in the Shahin F.C. organization in Tehran, the Isfahan branch was forced to cease operations. The club changed its name to Sepahan. The club participated in the Takht Jamshid Cup league from 1974 to 1978. In the club's first season in the Takht Jamshid Cup they finished in 10th place ahead of city rivals Zob Ahan.

Post Revolution
After the Revolution, they played in the local Isfahan leagues for many years until 1993. That year the club was purchased by the Siman-e-Sepahan (Sepahan Cement) factory of Isfahan. It participated in the Azadegan League until the year 2000, when Foolad Mobarekeh (Steel Mill of Mobarekeh Isfahan) bought the team from the Siman factory. The team now plays under the name of Foolad Mobarakeh Sepahan, and enjoys very good support by the club board, and has been able to attain a respectable fan base in its hometown.

Success years
The club was able to demonstrate its worth when it captured the league title in the 2002–03 season of the IPL, and qualified for the AFC Champions League tournament with Farhad Kazemi. It also won the Hazfi Cup in 2004 and was able to qualify for another season of the ACL competition, though the club did not have much success in the continental tournaments of ACL 2004 and 2005.

With Luka Bonačić, Sepahan was able to once again win the Hazfi Cup on 22 September 2006. With this win, they gained Iran's final and second spot in the AFC Champions League 2007. They were impressive in continental stage as they finished top of their group and defeated Kawasaki Frontale of Japan and Al Wahda of the UAE to reach the final of the newly established continental tournament for the first time. Although they lost the final to Urawa Red Diamonds on aggregate, by reaching the final, Sepahan became the first Iranian club to qualify for the FIFA Club World Cup.

In the opening match of the FIFA Club World Cup 2007, Sepahan defeated Waitakere United of New Zealand to reach the quarter-final where they met Urawa Red Diamonds for a spot in the semifinal match against AC Milan. Urawa Reds managed to defeat Sepahan for the second time in just one month, reaching the semifinals of the FIFA Club World Cup.

By winning the Hazfi Cup once again in 2007, Sepahan also qualified for the AFC Champions League 2008, but could not repeat their success of 2007.

Sepahan has qualified for the AFC Champions League for the third consecutive time in 2009, coming as the Runners-up in Persian Gulf Cup 2007-08. Sepahan lost the title by only one point to Persepolis F.C., who beat them 2–1 in the last match of the season with a winner six minutes into second half injury time. They tried to improve the team by sacking the Brazilian coach Viera and replacing him with the German coach Firat but they had a difficult season where they could not win anything in the 2008–09 season and changed the coach three times.

In the next season Sepahan hired Turkish and former Iran's assistant coach Engin Firat, but he was fired after getting poor result in the league, and Hossein Charkhabi who was Sepahan Novin head coach at that time replaced Firat. Despite getting good result with the team Charkahbi was replaced once again with Farhad Kazemi who won the league title with Sepahan in the 2002–03 season. Finally Sepahan finished 4th in the league and qualified for the 2010 AFC Champions League Group stage. In the next season the club hired former Iran and Esteghlal head coach Amir Ghalenoei, at the helm of Sepahan's 2010 Season, the club sealed a championship title two weeks before the end of the season with a 2–2 tie against F.C. Aboomoslem.

In the 2010–11 Persian Gulf Cup, Sepahan dominated the league after a slow start and practically won the title two weeks before the season end. They also advanced to the knock out stage of the ACL competition, after finishing on top of the table in the group stage. Their group was arguably the group of death, consisting of Al-Hilal, Al Gharafa and Al-Jazira. They won their third championship and became the most successful team in Iran Pro League.

Kranjčar Era
They also repeated their league title in 2011–12 season, this time with Croatian manager, Zlatko Kranjčar. Sepahan also made it to the quarter-finals of 2012 AFC Champions League after defeating the fellow Iranian club Esteghlal.

In 2013 however, Sepahan was placed in Group C of the 2013 AFC Champions League and was unable to get past the 2013 AFC Champions League group stage. Being placed in the same group as Al-Gharafa Sports Club of Qatar, Al-Ahli SC of Saudi Arabia and United Arab Emirates' Al Nasr SC, they could not qualify as one of the top two teams of their group. Sepahan started the 2013 AFC Champions League with a great win at home against Al Nasr SC, however heading for an away game against Al-Gharafa Sports Club in Qatar, Sepahan only returned home humiliated by the Qatari team in a 3–1 lost game. That was not the end of Sepahan's poor performance in the AFC Champions League. About three weeks after their loss in Qatar, Sepahan hosted Al-Ahli SC at Foolad Shahr Stadium, losing poorly once again but this time with a score of 4–2. Sepahan still had a chance after those two losses, but all hopes were lost once they lost in front of the Saudi giants again, this time with a score of 4–1 thus having them bid farewell to the 2013 AFC Champions League.

In the 2013–14 Iran Pro League season, Sepahan finished 4th, thus missing out on the AFC Champions League for the first time in five years. At the end of the season, Croatian manager Zlatko Kranjčar announced that he would not be returning for the 2014–2015 season. Sepahan also struggled in the Champions League as well, failing to make it past the group stage with a 1–0 loss to Al Hilal on the final match day. After originally announcing he was leaving the club, Sepahan announced that they had extended the contract of Kranjčar for another season.

Faraki years
Sepahan started the 2014–15 season with three wins in a row. However, Sepahan did not win their next four matches. Kranjčar resigned on 8 September 2014 and was replaced with former Foolad manager Hossein Faraki.

On 15 May 2015, with a 2–0 Sepahan victory over Saipa and Tractor drawing 3–3 with Naft Tehran, Sepahan won their fifth league title with a one-point margin over runner up Tractor. With the league victory, Sepahan returned to the AFC Champions League after a one-year absence.

On 12 November 2015 Hossein Faraki left Sepahan for personal problems. Faraki left by saying "Things just don’t seem to be working out for me and I decided to quit my job in the team, I have nothing more to say because I think Sepahan needs concentration at the moment since they will play in Iran’s Hazfi Cup on Thursday,"

Štimac and Veisi years
After Hossein Faraki's resignation, the club signed former Croatian national team manager Igor Štimac. Igor Štimac won his first game against Naft Tehran, but after not winning a game in 10 weeks made the situations harder for Sepahan. Sepahan got knocked out of the Hazfi Cup by their rivals, Zob Ahan in penalties at the semi-final. Sepahan also went out of the AFC Champions League after losing five times in the first round. Igor Štimac resigned as Sepahan head coach on 20 April 2016, after a run of unsuccessful results which led the league champions Sepahan to end up in 11th place and out of both season's cups, Hazfi Cup and AFC Champions League.

Before the start of the 2016–17 season, Abdollah Veisi who had led Esteghlal Khuzestan to the league title, was announced as the new manager of Sepahan but sepahans poor results continued so they announced Zlatko Kranjčar as their new manager. Sepahan finished the season in the 5th place.

Reserve team

Sepahan is also one of the clubs in Iranian football to have a senior reserve team, Foolad Sepahan Novin F.C., that as of the 2007/08 season, participates in 3rd Division and the Hazfi Cup. The reserve team was promoted to the Iran Pro League from the Azadegan League, but was not allowed to participate due to Fifa's regulations about two teams from the same club playing in the same league.

Rivalries

Isfahan Derby

The Nagsh-e- Jahan derby is a football match played annually in of Isfahan, Iran, between the two rival professional teams of the city: Zob Ahan F.C. and Sepahan.
Naqsh-e Jahan is an important square in old centrum of Isfahan.

According to Iranian football journalist Afshin Afshar, the competition is one of the most popular annual football events in Iran. The Isfahan derby goes back to the 1970s, when Zob Ahan F.C. and Sepahan F.C. faced each other in Takht Jamshid Cup seasons (1974/75, 1975/76, 1976/77, 1977/78). Their rivalry resumed in the 1990s when they faced each other in
Azadegan League seasons (1993/94, 1996/97, 1997/98) and from then on the two met each other twice a year.

Tehran rivalries

Esteghlal–Sepahan and Persepolis–Sepahan rivalries are the two important Iran Football Rivalries played between Sepahan and two Tehran based football clubs: Esteghlal and Persepolis.

FIFA Club World Cup
One of the most important titles of Sepahan football club, which makes this club a special club in Iranian football, is the participation in the Club World Cup in 2007.
For the people of Isfahan and those interested in football, especially the fans of Sepahan and of course Iranian football, the second day of November is undoubtedly a reminder of the name of Sepahan. On the day when the club was born, Sepahan's name was placed next to big teams such as AC Milan of Italy, Boca Juniors of Argentina, Pachuca of Mexico, Whiteacres United of New Zealand, Sahil Tunis and Overwards of Japan. Until today, Sepahan is the first and last representative of Iranian football who has hoisted the Iranian flag in the Club World Cup.

Partnerships

On 28 January 2009, Sepahan and Lebanese club Ahed signed an informal partnership deal. The partnership was made official on 8 March 2021, involving training camps and friendly games between the two sides.

Stadium

The Naghsh-e-Jahan Stadium is a multi-purpose stadium in Isfahan, Iran that is home ground of Sepahan. It is currently used for football matches. The stadium was built in 2003 and holds 45,000 in a three-tier configuration. The first phase finished in 2003 and they have decided to finish the second phase which is the first floor of the stadium. It was started in 2007 and was meant to be finished by 2008, but construction continued until summer 2016. The final capacity of the stadium will be 75,000. Sepahan's second home ground is Foolad Shahr Stadium that is the home ground of Zob Ahan F.C. too. Some of Sepahan's matches are held in that stadium.

Season-by-season
For details on seasons, see List of Sepahan F.C. seasons

{| class="wikitable"
|-bgcolor="#efefef"
! Season
! Div.
! Pos.
!Hazfi Cup
!colspan=2|Asia
|-
|align=center|2001–02
|align=center|IPL
|align=center|9th
|align=center|Semi-Final
|align=center|-
|align=center|-
|-
|align=center|2002–03
|align=center|IPL
|align=center bgcolor=gold|Champions
|align=center|Semi-Final
|align=center|-
|align=center|-
|-
|align=center|2003–04
|align=center|IPL
|align=center|6th
|align=center bgcolor=gold|Champions
|align=center|ACL
|align=center|Group stage
|-
|align=center|2004–05
|align=center|IPL
|align=center|10th
|align=center|1/8 Final
|align=center|ACL
|align=center|Group stage
|-
|align=center|2005–06
|align=center|IPL
|align=center|7th
|align=center bgcolor=gold|Champions
|align=center|-
|align=center|-
|-
|align=center|2006–07
|align=center|PGC
|align=center|5th
|align=center bgcolor=gold|Champions
|align=center|ACL
|align=center bgcolor=silver|Runner Up
|-
|align=center|2007–08
|align=center|PGC
|align=center bgcolor=silver|2nd
|align=center|Quarter-Final
|align=center|ACL
|align=center|Group stage
|-
|align=center|2008–09
|align=center|PGC
|align=center|4th
|align=center|1/8 Final
|align=center|ACL
|align=center|Group stage
|-
|align=center|2009–10
|align=center|PGC
|align=center bgcolor=gold|Champions
|align=center|1/8 Final
|align=center|ACL
|align=center|Group stage
|-
|align=center|2010–11
|align=center|PGC
|align=center bgcolor=gold|Champions
|align=center|Quarter-Final
|align=center|ACL
|align=center|Quarter-Final
|-
|align=center|2011–12
|align=center|PGC
|align=center bgcolor=gold|Champions
|align=center|Round of 32
|align=center|ACL
|align=center|Quarter-Final
|-
|align=center|2012–13
|align=center|PGC
|align=center bgcolor=#d28c47|3rd
|align=center bgcolor=gold|Champions
|align=center|ACL
|align=center|Group stage
|-
|align=center|2013–14
|align=center|PGC
|align=center|4th
|align=center|Round of 32
|align=center|ACL
|align=center|Group stage
|-
|align=center|2014–15
|align=center|PGPL
|align=center bgcolor=gold|Champions
|align=center|Round of 32
|align=center|-
|align=center|-
|-
|align=center|2015–16
|align=center|PGPL
|align=center|11th
|align=center|Semi-Final
|align=center|ACL
|align=center|Group stage
|-
|align=center|2016–17
|align=center|PGPL
|align=center|5th
|align=center|Semi-Final
|align=center|-
|align=center|-
|-
|align=center|2017–18
|align=center|PGPL
|align=center|14th
|align=center|Round of 32
|align=center| -
|align=center| -
|-
|2018–19
|PGPL
|align=center bgcolor=silver|2nd
|align=center|Semi-Final
|align=center| -
|align=center| -
|-
|align=center|2019–20
|align=center|PGPL
|align=center|5th
|align=center|Quarter-Final
|align=center|ACL
|align=center|Group stage
|-
|2020–21
|PGPL
|align=center bgcolor=silver|2nd
|align=center|Quarter-Final
|align=center| -
|align=center| -
|-
|2021–22
|PGPL
|align=center bgcolor=#d28c47|3rd
|align=center|Round of 16
|align=center|ACL
|align=center|Group Stage
|-
|}

Honours

Domestic

League
Persian Gulf Pro League
Winners (5): 2002–03, 2009–10, 2010–11, 2011–12, 2014–15
Runners-up (3): 2007–08, 2018–19, 2020–21
 2nd Division
Winner (1): 1973–74

Cup
Hazfi Cup
Winners (4): 2003–04, 2005–06, 2006–07, 2012–13

Continental
AFC Champions League
Runners-up (1): 2007

Players

First-team squad

 (on loan from Portimonense)

 U21 = Under-21 level player. U23 = Under-23 level player. U25 = Under-25 level player. INJ = Out of main squad due to injury.

For recent transfers, see List of Iranian football transfers winter 2022–23.

Loan list

Former players
For details on former players, see :Category:Sepahan players.

Notable players
See: List of Sepahan players

Managerial staff

Current managerial staff

Head coaches
Below is a list of Sepahan coaches from 1953 until the present day.

Club officials

List of Sepahan records

FIFA Club World Cup participation

Top scorers by season

Players on international cups

Sponsorship

Shirt sponsors and manufacturers

References

External links

  Club Official Website
  The Club page in Soccerway.com
  The Club page in Persianleague.com

Football clubs in Iran
Association football clubs established in 1953
 
1953 establishments in Iran
Sport in Isfahan